157P/Tritton is a periodic comet with a 6 year orbital period. Fragment B was first observed on 21 August 2021.

Discovery  
Keith Tritton (U. K. Schmidt Telescope Unit, Coonabarabran) discovered this comet on a deep IIIa-J exposure made with the 122-cm Schmidt telescope on 1978 February 11.66.

Historical Highlights 
 A preliminary orbit was calculated by M. P. Candy (Perth Observatory, Australia) using positions obtained by Tritton on February 11, 13, and 15. It was an elliptical orbit with a perihelion date of 1977 October 30.07 and an orbital period of 7.30 years. B. G. Marsden (Smithsonian Astrophysical Observatory) revised the orbit using five positions spanning the period of February 11 to March 13. He also gave an elliptical orbit with a perihelion date of October 28.51 and an orbital period of 6.33 years.
 Moonlight made observations impossible during the last half of February 1978 and during the early days of March; however, the comet was found by J. H. Bulger (Harvard Observatory's Agassiz Station) on March 10.27. He gave the nuclear magnitude as 20. The last three observations of the comet were obtained by Shao on March 11.28, 13.20, and 14.21. On IAU Circular No. 3194, issued on 1978 March 15, Marsden wrote, "It is possible that the comet experienced an outburst around the time of the Harvard observation on Feb. 15...." No observations were obtained thereafter.
 The comet was not detected during the predicted returns of 1984, 1990 or 1996 and was presumed lost.
 However, on 2003 October 6.44, using CCD images obtained with a 0.12-m refractor, C. W. Juels (Fountain Hills, Arizona, USA) and P. Holvorcem (Campinas, Brazil) detected a comet that proved to be on a similar orbit to the lost comet. B. G. Marsden was able to calculate a new orbit, published in IAU Circular No. 8215, issued 2003 October 7, which confirmed that it was indeed identical to comet Tritton.
 The comet was also recovered at its 2010, 2016, and 2022 apparitions. 
 On 2 October 2022 the discovery of a new fragment of the comet was published in MPEC 2022-T23.

References

External links 
 Orbital simulation from JPL (Java) / Horizons Ephemeris
 157P/Tritton – Seiichi Yoshida @ aerith.net
 157P at Gary W. Kronk's Cometography

Periodic comets
0157